Talwandi Rai is a village in Ludhiana district in the India of Punjab. It is 37 km from Ludhiana city, near Raikot.

History
Talwandi Rai was reputedly founded in 1478 AD by the Rai Kalha I who was a Muslim Rajput. The village was autonomous during most of the British rule in India and was ruled by a Rajput King up until the late 1800s when the British Raj demanded the Rai adhere to British demands. In return Muslim rule was maintained until the partition in 1947. The descendants of the last pre-partition ruler of Talwandi Rai can be found in Pakistan.

Now
Talwandi Rai, finished construction on the Ganga Sagar Gurdwara. The temple has been fitted with lights that run across the whole building, visible for miles.

Talwandi Rai is still up, standing, and thriving to this day. The community is welcoming, kind, and their hospitality is awe-inducing. Everyone knows everyone here, and treat each other like family. If you are to visit, it is guaranteed that you won’t forget a single moment here.

See also
 Jagraon
 Mullanpur Dakha

References

Villages in Ludhiana district